Pedapudi Mandal is one of the 21 mandals in Kakinada District of Andhra Pradesh. As per census 2011, there are 17 villages.

Demographics 
Pedapudi Mandal has total population of 71,459 as per the Census 2011 out of which 35,883 are males while 35,576 are females and the average Sex Ratio of Pedapudi Mandal is 991. The total literacy rate of Pedapudi Mandal is 70.61%. The male literacy rate is 65.82% and the female literacy rate is 61.57%.

Towns & Villages

Villages 

Atchutapuratrayam
Chintapalle
Domada
G. Mamidada
Gandredu
Kaikavolu
Kandregula
Karakuduru
Kumarapriyam
Pedapudi
Peddada
Puttakonda
Pyna
Rajupalem
Sahapuram
Sampara
Vendra

See also 
List of mandals in Andhra Pradesh

References 

Mandals in Kakinada district
Mandals in Andhra Pradesh